Gossaigaon Hat railway station serves the town of Gossaigaon, Kokrajhar district in the Indian state of Assam.
The station lies on the New Jalpaiguri–New Bongaigaon section of Barauni–Guwahati line of Northeast Frontier Railway. This station falls under Alipurduar railway division.

Trains
Major Trains:
Sealdah–Agartala Kanchanjunga Express
Sealdah–Silchar Kanchanjunga Express
Delhi–Dibrugarh Brahmaputra Mail
Alipurduar–Lumding Intercity Express
Alipurduar–Kamakhya Intercity Express
New Jalpaiguri - Bongaigaon Express

References

Alipurduar railway division
Railway stations in Assam
Railway stations in Kokrajhar district